Shelly Gotlieb (born 28 July 1980) is a snowboarder from New Zealand. She won a bronze medal at the 2011 FIS Snowboarding World Championships in slopestyle.

References

External links
 FIS-Ski.com – Biography

1980 births
Living people
New Zealand female snowboarders
Snowboarders at the 2014 Winter Olympics
Olympic snowboarders of New Zealand
People from Raetihi